Israel Hajaj is a retired Israeli footballer who is known for being the legendary captain of Maccabi Netanya in the late 1970s. He is of a Tunisian-Jewish descent.

Honours

National
Israeli Premier League (5):
1970–71, 1973–74, 1977–78, 1979–80, 1981–82
State Cup (1):
1978

International
UEFA Intertoto Cup (2):
1978, 1980

References

1950 births
Israeli Jews
Living people
Israeli footballers
Maccabi Netanya F.C. players
Maccabi Petah Tikva F.C. players
Hapoel Kfar Saba F.C. players
Liga Leumit players
Footballers from Netanya
Israeli people of Tunisian-Jewish descent
Association football defenders
Israel international footballers